Falmouth is an unincorporated community and census-designated place (CDP) in Conoy Township, Lancaster County, Pennsylvania, United States. As of the 2010 census the population was 420, but the 2020 census shows that the population has decreased to 397.

Geography
Falmouth is in the northwest corner of Lancaster County, at the confluence of Conewago Creek with the Susquehanna River. It is bordered to the northwest, across Conewago Creek, by Londonderry Township in Dauphin County. To the southwest, across the Susquehanna River, is the borough of York Haven in York County.

Demographics

References

 

Census-designated places in Lancaster County, Pennsylvania
Census-designated places in Pennsylvania
Unincorporated communities in Lancaster County, Pennsylvania
Unincorporated communities in Pennsylvania